Ilatardia is an extinct genus of bothremydid pleurodiran turtle that was discovered in the Farin Doutchi Formation of Niger. The genus consists solely of type species I. cetiotesta.

Discovery 
The holotype of Ilatardia was discovered in the Farin-Doutchi Formation of Niger. It consists entirely of a large, relatively complete skull, around 20 cm in length.

References 

Prehistoric turtle genera
Late Cretaceous turtles
Bothremydidae
Maastrichtian life
Cretaceous Africa
Fossil taxa described in 2019